The Fire Meets the Fury Tour is a 1989 concert tour co-headlined by Stevie Ray Vaughan and Jeff Beck. Epic Records paired the two guitarists together for a 29-day concert tour starting in Minneapolis, Minnesota. This tour was the third leg of the Stevie Ray Vaughan and Double Trouble In Step Tour. In addition to being one of the highest-grossing concert tours of 1989, The Fire Meets the Fury Tour won the Pollstar magazine award for most creative tour package of the year. 

The bands rehearsed at Prince's Paisley Park Studios on October 23 and 24, before beginning the tour at the Northrup Auditorium on October 25, 1989. Both Vaughan and Beck were advertised as headliners and received equal billing for the tour. In order to ensure equal billing, Vaughan and Beck alternated headline spots. Vaughan's manager Alex Hodges commented: "We were very careful to have equal billing and everything done in a way that it would be hard to say anyone was taking advantage of the other." Jeff Beck won a coin flip by lighting designer Andy Elias and was named the headline act for the opening show in Minneapolis. During the final show on December 3 in Oakland, California, in which Jeff Beck was the opening act, Carlos Santana joined Stevie Ray Vaughan on stage while playing a borrowed Stratocaster.

Touring personnel 

Bands:

Stevie Ray Vaughan and Double Trouble
 Stevie Ray Vaughan (guitars, vocals)
 Chris Layton (drums)
 Tommy Shannon (bass)
 Reese Wynans (keyboards)

Jeff Beck with Terry Bozzio and Tony Hymas
 Jeff Beck (guitars)
 Terry Bozzio (drums)
 Tony Hymas (keyboards)

Management/tour staff:
 Paul "Skip" Rickert (tour manager)
 Mark Rutledge (production manager)
 Bill Mounsey (stage manager)
 René Martinez (guitar technician)
 John "Bondo" Bond (keyboard technician)
 Johnny "JW" Roberts (monitor engineer)
 Andy Elias (set/lighting designer)
 Gary Kudrna (sound technician)
 Randy Bryant (sound technician)
 Richard Luckett (tour merchandise manager)
 Alex Hodges/Strike Force (talent management/Stevie Ray Vaughan)
 Ernest Chapman (talent management/Jeff Beck)

Videos
 Video from The Fire Meets the Fury Tour at the UIC Pavilion in Chicago (10/28/1989)
 Video of 1989 MTV Interview with Stevie Ray Vaughan and Jeff Beck

Typical setlists

Jeff Beck with Terry Bozzio and Tony Hymas

 "Savoy"
 "Guitar Shop"
 "Big Block"
 "Sling Shot"
 "Behind the Veil"
 "Freeway Jam"
 "Where Were You"
 "Day in the House"
 "Stand on It"
 "Goodbye Pork Pie Hat" (Charles Mingus cover)
 "Blue Wind"
 "People Get Ready" (The Impressions cover) 
 "Going Down" (Alabama State Troopers cover)

Stevie Ray Vaughan & Double Trouble

 "The House Is Rockin'"
 "Tightrope"
 "Look at Little Sister" (Hank Ballard cover)
 "Mary Had a Little Lamb" (Buddy Guy cover)
 "Let Me Love You Baby" (Buddy Guy cover)
 "Texas Flood" (Larry Davis cover)
 "Wall of Denial"
 "Superstition" (Stevie Wonder cover)
 "Couldn't Stand the Weather"
 "Cold Shot"
 "Riviera Paradise"
 "Life Without You"
 "Crossfire"
 "Voodoo Child (Slight Return)" (The Jimi Hendrix Experience cover)

Tour dates

References

Sources

 

Stevie Ray Vaughan concert tours
1989 concert tours